The RGA-86 (pol. Ręczny Granatnik Automatyczny wz 86, Handheld Automatic Grenade Launcher pattern 86) is a Polish 26 mm revolver grenade launcher, developed between 1983 and 1986 at the Wojskowa Akademia Techniczna state research institute by a team consisting of: S. Ciepielski, M. Czeladzki, S. Derecki, H. Głowicki, W. Koperski, J. Pawłowski and R. Wójcik.

See also
List of shotguns
Granatnik RGP-40
Hawk MM-1
Manville gun
RG-6 grenade launcher

Riot guns
Weapons of Poland
Revolver shotguns
Military equipment introduced in the 1980s